Cryptocheilus bicolor (orange spider wasp)  is a large, strikingly coloured spider wasp from Australia.

Description
Females can be up to 35mm in length.  The head, legs and antenna are black and orange-yellow in colour, with dark brown to black thorax and eyes. The wings are orange brown colour and there are the broad orange bands on the black abdomen.

Biology

This wasp is a predator of the huntsman spiders (family Sparassidae) and wolf spiders (Lycosidae). It paralyses the spider by stinging it in its underside. The prey is then dragged to a burrow, dug by the female using shovel-like hairs on its front legs. The wasp then lays an egg on the spider, and conceals the nesting chamber at the end of the burrow. When the grub hatches it feeds on the spider before pupating in a thin silky cocoon in the cell.

The wasp's sting has been described as extremely painful and "shockingly powerful".

References

Insects described in 1775
Taxa named by Johan Christian Fabricius
Pepsinae
Insects of Australia